Busca una Mujer, also known as Un Hombre Busca una Mujer, is the sixth studio album by Mexican singer Luis Miguel. It was mainly written and produced by Juan Carlos Calderón, and released on November 25, 1988, as the second album released with Warner Music. "Fría Como el Viento" was released as the album's lead single, which spent seven months on the top-ten of many record charts in Latin America. The success of "Fría Como el Viento" almost overshadowed the rest of the singles released from the album ("Separados", "La Incondicional", "Un Hombre Busca una Mujer", "Culpable o No (Miénteme Como Siempre)", "Esa Niña" and "El Primero" ). The album title was simply Busca una Mujer since his name would complement the title (i.e. meaning Luis Miguel Busca una Mujer). On the Billboard Hot Latin Songs Year-End Chart of 1989, "La Incondicional" appeared at number three. "Separados" has since become known among fans of professional wrestling for being the entrance theme of Japanese masked wrestler Último Dragón, outside of his tenure in WWE.

Promotion

To promote the album, Luis Miguel embarked on a tour during 1989 and 1990. In 1989 a VHS video was released, a compilation of his concerts in Mexico called Un Año de Conciertos.

Track listing 

Brazilian version

There is a Brazilian version of the Album Busca Una Mujer, released in 1988 with 2 songs in Portuguese, “Fria Como O Vento” and “A Incondicional”.

Personnel 
Adapted from the Busca Una Mujer liner notes:

Performance credits

 Juan Carlos Calderón – keyboards , arranger , chorus arrangement 
 Randy Kerber – keyboards , arranger , brass arranger 
 K.C. Porter – keyboards , arranger 
 Dennis Belfield – bass 
 John Robinson – drums 
 Jeff Porcaro – drums 
 Paul Jackson Jr. – guitar 
 Buzz Feiten – guitar , guitar solo 
 Jerry Hey – brass 
 Gary Grant – brass 
 Kim Hutchcroft – brass 
 Alan Kaplan – brass 
 Lew McCreary – brass 
 Antonio Molto – saxophone solo 
 Conjunto de Cuerda de Madrid – strings 
 Luis Miguel – background vocals , brass arranger 
 Andrea Bronston – background vocals 
 Mary Jamison – background vocals 
 Doris – background vocals 
 Huevo – background vocals 
 Mikel – background vocals

Technical credits

 Juan Carlos Calderón – producer
 Benny Faccone – engineer (rhythmic bases, dubbing, brass section)
 Brad Gilderman – mixer
 Stephen Marcussen – mastering engineer
 Carlos Martos – engineer (voice recording)
 Vicente - engineer (voice recording)
 Joaquin Torres – engineer (strings, additional dubs)
 Ivy Skoff – production coordination
 Carlos Somonte – photography
 Gilardi M/W S.A. publicidad – design

Recording and mixing locations

Studio 55, Hollywood, California – rhythmic bases and dubbing
Torresonido, Madrid, Spain – strings and additional dubs
Ocean Way Studios, Hollywood, California – brass section
Precision Lacquer, Hollywood, California – mastering
Suma Music Group, West Hollywood, California – mixing
Estudio Mediterranean Sound, Ibiza, Spain – Luis Miguel's voice recording

Chart performance

Album

Weekly charts

Year-end charts

Singles

Sales and certifications

See also 
 List of best-selling albums in Mexico
 List of best-selling Latin albums

References 

1988 albums
Luis Miguel albums
Warner Music Latina albums
Spanish-language albums
Albums produced by Juan Carlos Calderón